Katyayana may refer to:

 Katyayana (Buddhist), a disciple of Gautama Buddha.
 Kātyāyana, an Indian mathematician and Sanskrit grammarian.